Dallas Selwyn Townsend Jr. (January 17, 1919 - June 1, 1995) was an American broadcast journalist who worked for CBS Radio and television for over 40 years. An award jury at Columbia University said of Townsend, "No other newsman of our day has had a broader acquaintance with news nor communicated it with more economy and precision."

Early career
Born in New York City and raised in New Jersey, Townsend was the son of Dallas Townsend Sr., an attorney who once was assistant attorney general of the United States. He attended Montclair Kimberley Academy, graduating in the class of 1936. He graduated from Princeton University in 1940 and  the Columbia School of Journalism. He worked as a news editor at WQXR in New York City before he went to work at CBS. After working briefly for CBS as an editor in New York City he served in the United States Army as a communications officer. During World War II, he was served in New Guinea, the Philippines and Japan in signal and communication and rose to the rank of captain.

CBS
Townsend was associated with CBS for over 40 years. During his tenure he worked on the CBS Radio Network's morning World News Roundup and the Roundup'''s evening companion, then known as The World Tonight. In addition to regular newscasts, he covered each presidential convention and campaign from 1948 through 1980 and every American space launch from 1962 to 1980. Townsend covered a variety of other news events including: atomic tests, international peace conferences, and presidential inaugurations.

He anchored the CBS World News Roundup'' for the better part of 30 years, after CBS sent Winston Burdett to Rome in 1954. Most of that time he anchored 6 a.m. and 10 a.m. broadcasts but abandoned that schedule in last years with CBS because it required him to rise before the sun.

Townsend was Alan Jackson's broadcast partner on CBS Radio on November 22, 1963, covering the assassination of President John F. Kennedy in Dallas, Texas.  While Jackson anchored news reports from the wire services and from Texas, Townsend provided news and background information at various points in the initial broadcast.

Personal life
Townsend and his wife, Lois Bradley Townsend, lived in Montclair, New Jersey and raised four children, three daughters and a son: Katharine, Nancy, Patricia and Douglas. He retired in 1985 from CBS and moved to Sarasota, Florida. They spent much of their time in Bala, Ontario, Canada.

Death
Townsend died June 1, 1995, of injuries from a fall that he suffered a week earlier. He was 76 years old. He was survived by his wife and four children and ten grandchildren.

Recognition
In 1983, Townsend received an Alfred I. duPont–Columbia University Award for "intelligent and incisive reporting" over his career.

References

Sources
 Princeton University Memorials
American Journalism Review:The Last Good Meal in a World of Snacks
Caskets on Parade

1919 births
1995 deaths
American male journalists
United States Army personnel of World War II
American reporters and correspondents
Montclair Kimberley Academy alumni
Princeton University alumni
People from the District Municipality of Muskoka
People from Montclair, New Jersey
Columbia University Graduate School of Journalism alumni
United States Army officers
20th-century American writers
20th-century American journalists
20th-century American male writers